Adelphia is an unincorporated community located within the northern section of Howell Township in Monmouth County, New Jersey, United States. The area is served as United States Postal Service ZIP code 07710. The community borders Freehold Township.

Nomenclature
Prior to the community adapting its name from the Greek word for 'brotherhood' (adelphia), the area was previously known as Turkey. The only remnants of Turkey happen to lie within the title of a nearby county park, Turkey Swamp Park. Prior to the Turkey name the area was called "Blue Ball".

Geography and demographics
The community of Adelphia has a total area of 35.41 km (22 mi) and a population of 17,000 (est.) people. The area is composed of various portions of Howell Township, and reaches into portions of Colts Neck Township, Farmingdale and Freehold Township.

Education
Adelphia is the home of the Talmudical Academy of Central New Jersey, Howell Memorial Middle School and Adelphia School. Students from K-5 attend Adelphia School, students from 6-8 attend Howell Memorial Middle School, and students from 9-12 either attend Howell High School, Freehold Township High School or Colts Neck High School, depending on their location within the district. Griebling School, 130 Havens Bridge Road, is currently servicing Kindergarten to 2nd grade students only at this time..

The New Jersey Agricultural Experiment Station of Rutgers University also has a facility in Adelphia, the Rutgers Plant Science Research and Extension Farm.

Transportation
New Jersey Transit provides bus transportation to and from the Port Authority Bus Terminal in Midtown Manhattan on the 139 route and to both Jersey City and Newark on the 64 and 67 routes.

Climate
The climate in this area is characterized by hot, humid summers and generally mild to cool winters.  According to the Köppen Climate Classification system, Adelphia has a humid subtropical climate, abbreviated "Cfa" on climate maps.

Notable people

People who were born in, residents of, or otherwise closely associated with Adelphia include:
 Charles Asa Francis (1855-1934), politician who served in both the New Jersey General Assembly and New Jersey Senate.

Nearby historic communities
 Allaire in Wall Township
 Cassville in Jackson Township
 Clarksburg in Millstone Township
 Dayton in South Brunswick
 Jerseyville in Howell Township
 Marlboro in Marlboro Township, along with a detailed list of Historic Sites in Marlboro Township
 The Middletown Village Historic District in Middletown Township
 The Monmouth Battlefield Historic District in Freehold Township and Manalapan Township
 Ocean Grove in Neptune Township
 Old Bridge in East Brunswick
 Perrineville in Millstone Township
 Ramtown in Howell Township
 Tennent in Manalapan Township
 Wayside in Tinton Falls and Ocean Township (Monmouth County)
 West Freehold in Freehold Township

References

External links

Adelphia School
Memorial Middle School
Freehold Regional High School District

Neighborhoods in Howell Township, New Jersey
Unincorporated communities in Monmouth County, New Jersey
Unincorporated communities in New Jersey